Moussa Al-Maamari (موسى المعماري) (born; 27 July 1930 – 31 January 2018) was a Lebanese architect.

Early life
Al-Maamari was born in Baalbek District, Beqaa, in Lebanon.

Projects
His most notable build was Moussa Castle which is located on a hill between Deir El Kamar and Beiteddine, the castle features artifacts, gemstones, clothing, and 32,000 weapons.

Death
He died in 2018 in Deir al-Qamar, Lebanon.

See also
 Moussa Castle

References 

1930 births
Lebanese architects
Modernist architects
2018 deaths